Montoliu may refer to:

Montoliu de Lleida, municipality in the province of Lleida and autonomous community of Catalonia, Spain
Montoliu de Segarra, municipality in the province of Lleida and autonomous community of Catalonia, Spain
Cebrià de Montoliu (1873–1923), Spanish architect, planner, and translator
Pedro Montoliú (born 1954), Spanish journalist
Tete Montoliu (1933–1997), Spanish jazz pianist